Goran Filipec (born 1981 in Rijeka) is a Croatian concert pianist.

Biography 
During his early career Filipec won top prizes at international piano competitions (José Iturbi International Music Competition in Los Angeles in 2009; Concurso de Parnassos in Monterrey in 2010; Gabala International Piano Competition in Azerbaijan in 2009; Concorso Pianistico Internazionale Franz Liszt - "Premio Mario Zanfi" in Parma in 2011).

Filipec has performed internationally, having performed at the Carnegie Hall, Auditorium di Milano, Mariinsky Theatre, Béla Bartók National Concert Hall in Budapest, Philharmonie de Paris and other concert halls of Europe, North and South America and Japan.

He studied piano at the Academy "Ino Mirkovich", and got a doctorate in music from Sorbonne University, he later specialized at the Hochschüle für Musik Köln, Oxana Yablonskaya Piano Institute, Moscow state conservatory "P.I.Tchaikovsky" and the Royal Conservatoire of The Hague. His most important piano teachers were Naum Grubert, Oxana Yablonskaya and Natalia Trull. 

He founded the Société Franz Liszt de Genève, a group based on researching and promoting Franz Liszt's music.

Discography 
2016 – Franz Liszt: Paganini Studies (CD)  /Naxos Records
2014 – Ivo Maček: Complete piano works & Sonata for violin and piano (CD)  /Naxos Records
2012 – Liszt’s anniversary resonances (2CD) / Goran Filipec Productions
2006 –  Goran Filipec plays Rachmaninov & Mussorgsky (CD)  / Eroica Classical Recordings

References
 
 Poderoso y sutil, en cantidades justas
 Pianista para el fin del mundo
 Beethoven brilló en Tierra del Fuego
 Gran prólogo para el Festival de Ushuaia
 Artist's website
 Zagreb Concert Management
 Classical Artists Worldwide

References

External links
 F. Liszt: Réminiscences de Norma (Bellini) - Goran Filipec, piano
 Goran Filipec à la Boîte à Music by Jean-François Zygel: Guerre et Paix
 Ivo Maček - Complete piano works - Goran Filipec, piano
 S. Rachmaninoff: Moment Musical Nr. 4 - Goran Filipec, piano
 F. Chopin: Polonaise op. 53 "Heroique" - Goran Filipec, piano
 S. Rachmaninoff: Moment Musical Nr. 2 - Goran Filipec, piano

Croatian classical pianists
1981 births
Living people
21st-century classical pianists